Taboo is the fourth studio album by the Japanese rock band Buck-Tick. It was released on cassette, CD and as a two-record vinyl set (one is a blank picture disc) on January 18, 1989 through Victor Entertainment. Taboo was digitally remastered and re-released on September 19, 2002, with two bonus tracks. It was remastered and re-released again on September 5, 2007. "Angelic Conversation" was re-recorded as the b-side to the group's single "M・A・D" in 1991. "Just One More Kiss", "Iconoclasm" and "Taboo" were later re-recorded for the compilation album Koroshi no Shirabe: This Is Not Greatest Hits (1992). "Iconoclasm" was covered by J for the Buck-Tick tribute album, Parade -Respective Tracks of Buck-Tick- (2005). Taboo peaked at number one on the Oricon charts, selling 298,620 copies in the first year.

Production 
The band recorded the album in London in the fall of 1988, the producer was Owen Paul. They also had a gig at the Greyhound Club, which the members of Der Zibet also attended. London made a lasting impression on Buck-Tick, especially Sakurai Atsushi, who felt that the local music scene was more accepting of darker, more serious music than the Japanese one. The album marks a turn in the band's career towards a darker style.

Track listing

Personnel
 Atsushi Sakurai - lead vocals
 Hisashi Imai - lead guitar, backing vocals
 Hidehiko Hoshino - rhythm guitar, acoustic guitar, backing vocals
 Yutaka Higuchi - bass
 Toll Yagami - drums, percussion

Additional performers
 Philip Hoeger - keyboards

Production
 Owen Paul - producer
 Buck-Tick - producers[A]
 Will Gosling; Roland Herrington; Mark Dearnley; Junko Yamazaki; Shuuji Yamaguchi - engineers, mixing
 Kenshi Kajiwara - assistant engineer
 Ken Sakaguchi - graphic design, cover art
 Kazuhiro Kitaoka - photography

Notes

<li id="notea">^^* The only song that Buck-Tick produced is "Just One More Kiss".
<li id="noteb">^* Released as the b-side to the "Just One More Kiss" single. Originally released as its own single in 1986.

References

Buck-Tick albums
Victor Entertainment albums
1989 albums